Brumby Hall is a late 17th-century residence and a Grade II* Listed building in Scunthorpe, North Lincolnshire.

History
The hall was constructed in the 17th century; a sundial dated to 1637 is present onsite. It was extended in the late 18th century by George Pycock for Thomas Pindar, and further altered and extended in the 19th and 20th centuries. In the early 17th century, the hall was home to Richard Bellingham (later Governor of the Massachusetts Bay Colony), and latterly to Nathaniel Fiennes.

References

17th-century establishments in England
Buildings and structures in Lincolnshire
Grade II* listed buildings in North Lincolnshire
Buildings and structures in Scunthorpe